The 1978 Soviet First League was the eighth season of the Soviet First League and the 38th season of the Soviet second tier league competition.

Final standings

Number of teams by union republic

See also
 Soviet First League

External links
 1978 season. RSSSF

1978
2
Soviet
Soviet